Stéphane Rambaud (born 5 April 1960) is a French politician and former police officer from National Rally (RN) who has represented the 3rd constituency of Var in the National Assembly since 2022.

Biography
Rambaud was born in Algiers, then in French Algeria in 1960 to pied-noir parents. He continues to identify himself as a pied-noir. He moved to metropolitan France and served as an officer in the National Police for over thirty years.

He was nominated by the National Rally to stand in the third constituency of the Var for the legislative elections of 2022. He came second in the first round with 27.03 % behind the LREM Isabelle Montfort against whom he won in the second round with 50.42 % of the votes cast.

Outside of politics, Rambaud holds a black belt in judo and is a father to seven children.

See also 

 List of deputies of the 16th National Assembly of France

References 

Living people
1960 births
Deputies of the 16th National Assembly of the French Fifth Republic
21st-century French politicians
Members of Parliament for Var
National Rally (France) politicians
French police officers
Pieds-Noirs
People from Algiers
French people of Algerian descent